Ernest Plummer (born 31 May 1872, date of death unknown) was a Trinidadian cricketer. He played in two first-class matches for Trinidad and Tobago in 1895/96 and 1896/97.

See also
 List of Trinidadian representative cricketers

References

External links
 

1872 births
Year of death missing
Trinidad and Tobago cricketers